Marusudar river or Maru Sudar river is the largest river tributary of the Chenab River, beginning at the Nunkun glacier of the Warwan Valley and joining the Chenab at Bhandarkoot in the Kishtwar district. As of 2021, 1000MW Pakal Dul Dam the 800MW Bursar Hydroelectric Project are under construction on this river.

Origin
The Marusudar river starts from the Nunkun glacier of the Warwan Valley of the Kishtwar district and joins the Chenab river at Bhandarkoot, Kishtwar.

Controversies over Dams
In 2018, locals protested against the Bursar Dam project, demanding cancellation of this dam.

While environmentalists have raised concern over the Pakal Dul Dam, claiming that it will have an impact on biodiversity and cause villages to be flooded. According to the Environmental Impact Assessment (EIA), this project will affect 18 hamlets, affecting over 17,000 people, and clearing around 1150 ha of forest area. As per EIA, the dam could obstruct fish migration during the season, impacting endemic fish species and reproductive areas. This involves a site visit and the MoEFF's environmental approval. However, the proposal was approved without a site visit, causing indignation among the locals.

References

Rivers of India
Rivers of Jammu and Kashmir
Dam controversies